Meloy is a surname. Notable people with the surname include:

Colin Meloy (born 1974), American singer-songwriter and author
Ellen Meloy (1946–2004), American writer
Francis E. Meloy, Jr. (1917–1976), American diplomat
Guy S. Meloy, Jr. (1903–1964), United States Army general
Maile Meloy (born 1972), American writer
Paul Meloy (born 1966), English writer